Vitali Sergeyevich Orlov (born 9 January 1992) is a former Russian football midfielder.

Club career
He made his debut in the Russian Second Division for FC Zvezda Ryazan on 5 August 2011 in a game against FC Spartak Tambov.

He made his Russian Football National League debut for FC Arsenal Tula on 2 August 2013 in a game against FC Shinnik Yaroslavl.

References

External links
 
 Profile by Sportbox
 

1992 births
Living people
Russian footballers
Association football midfielders
FC Chertanovo Moscow players
FC Arsenal Tula players